Henry Grace à Dieu ("Henry, Thanks be to God"), also known as Great Harry, was an English carrack or "great ship" of the King's Fleet in the 16th century, and in her day the largest warship in the world. Contemporary with Mary Rose, Henry Grace à Dieu was even larger, and served as Henry VIII's flagship. Built by William Bond (master shipwright) under the direction of Robert Brygandine (clerk of the ships), she had a large forecastle four decks high, and a stern castle two decks high. She was ordered by Henry VIII, probably to replace Grace Dieu (later renamed Regent), which had been destroyed at the Battle of Saint-Mathieu in August 1512, and at a time of naval rivalry with the Kingdom of Scotland, her size was in response to the Scottish ship Great Michael, which had herself been the largest warship when launched in 1511.

History

The ship was built from 1512 to 1514 at the purpose-built Gun Wharf in Old Woolwich. This wharf became the origin of Woolwich Dockyard, although in the 1540s the dockyard moved further west to an area known as "The King's Yard", where it would remain for more than 300 years. Henry Grace à Dieu was one of the first vessels to feature gunports and had twenty of the new heavy bronze cannon, allowing for a broadside. She was fitted out later in the Naval Dockyard in Erith. In all she mounted 43 heavy guns and 141 light guns. She was the first English two-decker and when launched she was, at 1500 tons burthen, the largest and most powerful warship in Europe.

Very early on it became apparent that the ship was top heavy. She was plagued with heavy rolling in rough seas and her poor stability adversely affected gun accuracy and general performance as a fighting platform. To correct this, she underwent a substantial remodeling in Erith in 1536 (the same year as Mary Rose), during which the height of the hull was reduced. In this new form she was 1000 tons burthen and carried 151 guns of varying size, including 21 of bronze (comprising 4 cannon, 3 demi-cannon, 4 culverins, 2 demi-culverins, 4 sakers, 2 cannon perriers and 2 falcons), her full crew was reduced to between 700 and 800. She was given an improved and innovative sailing arrangement with four masts, each divided into three sections; the forward two square rigged with mainsail, topsail and topgallants; and the aft two carrying five lateen sails between them. This allowed for easier handling of the sails and spread wind forces more evenly on the ship, resulting in better speed and maneuverability, and allowing better use of the heavy broadside. The only surviving contemporary depiction of the craft is from the Anthony Roll.

Henry Grace à Dieu saw little action. She was present at the Battle of the Solent against French forces in 1545, in which Mary Rose sank. Overall, she was used more as a diplomatic vessel, including taking Henry VIII to the summit with Francis I of France at the Field of the Cloth of Gold in 1520 (although smaller ships had to be used to take the King out of the harbours at Dover and Calais, as neither was deep enough to permit vessels of this draught to operate).

After the accession of Edward VI in 1547, she was renamed for him. She was accidentally destroyed at Woolwich by fire in August 1553.

See also
 Henry V's Grace Dieu (1418)
 Great Michael
 São João Baptista (galleon)
 Djong (ship)

Notes

References

Sources
 
 
 
 Lincoln P. Paine (1997) Ships of the World: An Historical Encyclopedia Houghton Mifflin  

Ships of the English navy
Individual sailing vessels
Ships built in Woolwich
16th-century ships
Ship fires